Seán Bourke  is an Irish sportsperson.  He plays hurling with the Laois senior inter-county hurling team. On 14 May 2011, he made his championship debut against Antrim in the 2011 All-Ireland Senior Hurling Championship, starting at centre field in a 1-21 to 3-12 defeat.

References

Living people
Laois inter-county hurlers
Year of birth missing (living people)